The 1921–22 season was Newport County's second season in the Football League. Due to league restructuring they were founding members of the new Football League Third Division South.

Season review

League

Results summary

Results by round

Fixtures and results

Third Division South

FA Cup

Welsh Cup

League table

Pld = Matches played; W = Matches won; D = Matches drawn; L = Matches lost; F = Goals for; A = Goals against;GA = Goal average; Pts = Points

External links
 Newport County 1921–1922 : Results
 Newport County football club match record: 1922
 Welsh Cup 1921–22

References

 Amber in the Blood: A History of Newport County. 

1921–22
English football clubs 1921–22 season
1921–22 in Welsh football
Welsh football clubs 1921–22 season